Kariz-e Hajj Mohammad Jan (also Romanized as Kārīz-e Ḩājj Moḩammad Jān; also known as Kārīz-e Moḩammad Jān, Kalāt-e Moḩammad Jān, Kalāt-i-Muhammad Jān, Kārīz-e Ḩājjī Moḩammad Jān, Kārīz-e Ḩājj Moḩammad, Kārīz-e Jāmī-ye Moḩammad Jān, and Kariz Haji Mohammad Jan) is a village in Sefid Sang Rural District, Qalandarabad District, Fariman County, Razavi Khorasan Province, Iran. At the 2006 census, its population was 1,438, in 330 families.

References 

Populated places in Fariman County